The Eritrea national football team represents Eritrea in international football under the control of the Eritrean National Football Federation (ENFF). After the Eritrean War of Independence with Ethiopia, Eritrea gained de jure recognition in 1993. The football federation was founded in 1996 and affiliated to FIFA and the Confederation of African Football (CAF) in 1998.

The following list contains all results of Eritrea's official matches.

Key

Pre-FIFA results

1992

1994

FIFA results

1998

1999

2000

2001

2002

2003

2005

2006

2007

2008

2009

2011

2012

2013

2015

2019

2020

2022

All-time record 
Key

 Pld = Matches played
 W = Matches won
 D = Matches drawn
 L = Matches lost

 GF = Goals for
 GA = Goals against
 GD = Goal differential
 Countries are listed in alphabetical order

As of 25 January 2020

References

External links 
RSSSF List of Matches
ELO List of Matches
National Football Teams List of Matches
Soccerway List of Matches
International-football.net List of Matches
FIFA List of Matches

Eritrea national football team